Luděk Krayzel (born January 14, 1975) is a Czech former professional ice hockey centre.

Krayzel played in the Czech Extraliga for HC Vítkovice and HC Vsetín. He also played in the SM-liiga for SaiPa, the Tipsport Liga for HKm Zvolen and HC Košice and the Ligue Magnus for Brûleurs de Loups. He finished his career in July 2015 after spending four seasons with HC RT Torax Poruba of the Czech 2. Liga

Career statistics

References

External links

1975 births
Living people
Brest Albatros Hockey players
Brûleurs de Loups players
Czech ice hockey centres
HC Havířov players
HC Košice players
SaiPa players
Sportspeople from Ostrava
HC Vítkovice players
VHK Vsetín players
HKM Zvolen players
Czech expatriate ice hockey players in Slovakia
Czech expatriate ice hockey players in Finland
Expatriate ice hockey players in France
Czech expatriate sportspeople in France